Franco Tentorio (born 5 January 1945 in Bergamo) is an Italian politician.

He served as Mayor of Bergamo from June 2009 to June 2014.

See also
2009 Italian local elections
List of mayors of Bergamo

References

External links
 

Living people
1945 births
Italian Social Movement politicians
National Alliance (Italy) politicians
Forza Italia (2013) politicians
The People of Freedom politicians
21st-century Italian politicians
Mayors of Bergamo
Politicians from Bergamo